The Hyderabadi Rupee was the currency of the Hyderabad State from 1918 to 1959. It coexisted with the Indian rupee from 1950. Like the Indian rupee, it was divided into 16 annas, each of 12 pai. Coins were issued in copper (later bronze) for denominations of 1 and 2 pai and  anna, in cupro-nickel (later bronze) for 1 anna and in silver for 2, 4 and 8 annas and 1 rupee.

Hyderabad was the only Indian princely state that was permitted to continue issuing its own notes after it was subjected to join the Dominion of India in 1948 and the Republic of India in 1950.

History

The Government of Hyderabad made several efforts to organize private bankers to set up a banking company which could issue paper money. The British, however, resisted the attempts of Indian princely states to issue paper currency. The acute shortage of silver during the First World War and the contributions of Hyderabad to the British war effort led them to accept, in 1918, paper currency in denominations of Rs.10/- and Rs.100/- issued under the Hyderabad Currency Act.

The currency was designated the Osmania Sicca (OS). One and five rupee notes were subsequently issued in 1919 and one thousand rupee notes were issued in 1926. After the setting up of the India Currency Notes Press at Nashik, Hyderabadi notes came to be printed there.

In 1942, the Government of Hyderabad established the Hyderabad State Bank, with the responsibility, inter alia, of managing the OS. Hyderabad continued to mint its own coins until 1948, when India occupied the state after the Nizam refused to cede it to the new Dominion.

In 1950, the Indian rupee was introduced alongside the local currency, with the relationship of 7 Hyderabadi rupees = 6 Indian rupees being used. In 1951, the Hyderabadi rupee ceased to be issued and the Indian rupee became the main circulating currency, although the Hyderabadi rupee was not demonetized until 1959.

Banknotes

The banknotes of Hyderabad were issued from 1918 until 1953. The ruling Nizam of Hyderabad was Mir Osman Ali Khan. Notes issued as early as 1916 have been reported. The notes are dated in the Fasli Era, so adding 589 to the FE date will convert it to the AD date. They were printed in Urdu, with the value of currency written in Urdu, Marathi, Telugu, Kannada and English on them.

In 1932, a quantity of unissued, but water stained Hyderabadi notes in 5, 10, and 100 rupee denominations were recovered from the SS Egypt, which sank off the island of Ushant near Brest, northern France in 1922. Many of these were given a special stamping and sold as souvenirs. These notes were in the process of being shipped from England where they had been printed. These notes are of historic interest to notaphilists. Some of the notes are printed slightly later than the dates that they bear.

The double letter serial number prefix determines what series the note is located in. Some of the 1939-53 issues have a single serial number prefix series code letter.

Signature chart

The signature also provides a clue to the approximate period when a note was issued. It is not yet certain what titles the signatories held (in English), as the inscriptions are in Urdu.

Sir Reginald R. Clancy (1918–19)
Fakhr-ud-Din Ahmad         (1919–20)
Hyder Nawaz Jung           (1921–36)
Fakhr-Yar Jung             (1936–38 and 1940–41)
Mehdi Yar Jung             (1939)
Sir Ghulam Muhammad            (1941–45)
Liaquat Jung               (1945 and 1946–47)
Zahed Husain               (1945–46)
Zahed Jung                 (1946)
Moin Nawaz Jung            (1947–48)
D.R. Pradhan               (1948–49)
C.V.S. Rao                 (1950)
Dr. G.S. Melkote       (1950–53)

First issue (1916/18-19) Sir Reginald R. Clancy

PS261. 1 rupee. ND. (1919) Black on peach underprint. Back light brown.
PS262. 1 rupee. ND. (1919) Bicoloured.
PS264. 10 rupees. FE1327. (1916) Yellow-brown and black on lilac underprint. Series AB.

Second issue (1919-20) Fakhr-ud-Din Ahmad

PS263a. 5 rupees. FE1331. (1920). Green. Series IQ. Without signature. Sea salvage note (most with special stamping). Unissued.
PS265a. 10 rupees. FE1331. (1920). Yellow-brown and black on lilac underprint. Series AI. Without signature. Sea salvage note (most with special stamping). Unissued.
PS266a. 100 rupees. FE1331. (1920). Blue and black on tan underprint. Series PS. Without signature. Sea salvage note (most with special stamping). Unissued.

Third issue (1921-36) Hyder Nawaz Jung

PS263b. 5 rupees. FE1337. (1926). Green. Series LX.
PS263c. 5 rupees. FE1346. (1935). Green. Series MC.
PS265b. 10 rupees. FE1333. (1922). Yellow-brown and black on lilac underprint. Series AN.
PS265c. 10 rupees. FE1338. (1927). Series ?.
PS265d. 10 rupees. FE1339. (1928). Series BK.
PS265e. 10 rupees. FE1342. (1931). Series BW.
PS265f. 10 rupees. FE1344. (1933). Series ?.
PS265g. 10 rupees. FE1346. (1935). Series CH.
PS266b. 100 rupees. FE1339. (1928). Blue and black on tan underprint. Series PY-PZ.
PS266c. 100 rupees. FE1339. (1928). Series QA.
PS266d. 100 rupees. FE1334. (1923). Series PT.
PS267. 1,000 rupees. FE1340. (1929); FE1341. (1930). Red and black on light green underprint.

Fourth issue (1936-38) Fakhr-Yar Jung (1st time)

PS263d. 5 rupees. FE1347. (1936). Green. Series MD-ME.
PS265h. 10 rupees. FE1347. (1936). Yellow-brown and black on lilac underprint.
PS273a. 5 rupees. ND. (1938; 1940–41). Green and multicoloured.
PS274a. 10 rupees. ND. (1938; 1940–41). Light brown and multicoloured.
PS275a. 100 rupees. ND. (1938; 1940–41). Blue and multicoloured. Series QC.

Fifth issue (1939) Mehdi Yar Jung

PS271a. 1 rupee. ND. (1939). Brown and multicoloured. Series A.
PS273b. 5 rupees. ND. (1939). Green and multicoloured.
PS274b. 10 rupees. ND. (1939). Light brown and multicoloured.
PS275b. 100 rupees. ND. (1939). Blue and multicoloured. Series QF and QH-QJ.

Sixth issue (1940-41) Fakhr-Yar Jung (2nd time)

PS271b. 1 rupee. ND. (1940–41). Brown and multicoloured. Series B-M.

Seventh issue (1941-45) Sir Malik Ghulam Muhammad

PS271c. 1 rupee. ND. (1941–45). Brown and multicoloured. Series B-X. (two signatories).
PS273c. 5 rupees. ND. (1941–45). Green and multicoloured.
PS274c. 10 rupees. ND. (1941–45). Light brown and multicoloured.
PS275c. 100 rupees. ND (1941–45). Blue and multicoloured. Series QN and QP.

Eighth issue (1945) Liaquat Jung (1st time)

PS271c. 1 rupee. ND. (1945). Brown and multicoloured. Series B-X. (two signatories).
PS275d. 100 rupees. ND. (1945; 1946–47). Blue and multicoloured. Series QS.

Ninth issue (1945-46) Zahed Husain

PS271d. 1 rupee. ND. (1945–46). Brown and multicoloured. Series S-W.
PS272b. 1 rupee. ND. (1945–46).
PS273d. 5 rupees. ND. (1945–46). Green and multicoloured.
PS274d. 10 rupees. ND. (1945–46). Light brown and multicoloured.
PS275e. 100 rupees. ND. (1945–46). Blue and multicoloured. Series QY.

Tenth issue(1946) Zahed Jung

PS271e. 1 rupee. ND. (1946). Brown and multicoloured. Series X-Y.
PS272c. 1 rupee. ND. (1946).

Eleventh issue (1946-47) Liaquat Jung (2nd time)

PS272a. 1 rupee. ND. (1946–47). Brown and multicoloured. Series Z and AB.
PS273e. 5 rupees. ND. (1946–47). Green and multicoloured.
PS274e. 10 rupees. ND. (1946–47). Light brown and multicoloured.

Twelfth issue (1947-48) Moin Nawaz Jung

This issue is historic as it was issued in the short period that Hyderabad attempted to become independent as a constitutional monarchy within the British Commonwealth.

PS272d. 1 rupee. ND. (1947–48). Brown and multicoloured.

Thirteenth issue (1948-49) D.R. Pradhan

This was the first issue after Hyderabad was liberated from the Nizam's rule and forced to be incorporated into the Dominion of India as a result of Operation Polo.

PS272e. 1 rupee. ND. (1948–49). Brown and multicoloured.

Fourteenth issue (1950) C.V.S. Rao

This was the first issue after India became a republic (26 January 1950).

PS272f. 1 rupee. ND. (1950). Brown and multicoloured.

Fifteenth issue (1950-53) Dr. G.S. Melkote

PS272g. 1 rupee. ND. (1950–53). Brown and multicoloured.

References

Further reading

 Chenoy, P. B. (*1878); Rare Coins of Hyderabad State; Numismatist, Vol. 83 (July 1970), p. 945–63.
 RBI notes

Currencies of the British Empire
Modern obsolete currencies
Hyderabad State
Historical currencies of India
History of Marathwada
1959 disestablishments in India
1918 establishments in India
History of Hyderabad, India